Konstantinos Korelas (born 1 March 2000) is a Greek professional footballer who plays as an attacking midfielder for Gamma Ethniki club Trikala.

Honours
Volos
Football League: 2018–19

References

2000 births
Living people
Greek footballers
Super League Greece players
Football League (Greece) players
Anagennisi Karditsa F.C. players
Volos N.F.C. players
A.E. Karaiskakis F.C. players
Association football midfielders
Footballers from Karditsa
PAOK FC B players
PAOK FC players